John Harry Martin Gosden  (born 30 March 1951) is a British racehorse trainer. He has trained over 3,000 winners worldwide, including winners of the Breeders' Cup Classic, the Derby, the Arc, the King George, the Eclipse, and over 600 winners in the United States.

Gosden has trained the winners of over 100 Group 1 races in the United States, Europe, the Middle East and Asia. He is generally considered one of the finest and most successful racehorse trainers of his generation. His reputation for honesty and openness has led him to be called "one of the sport's great communicators".

He is the only trainer in history whose horses have won the Cartier Awards for Cartier Champion Three-year-old Colt, Cartier Champion Three-year-old Filly and Cartier Horse of the Year in the same year. He trains at Clarehaven Stables in Newmarket, England.

Early career
He was educated at Eastbourne College, and Emmanuel College, Cambridge, where he studied Economics and met his future wife, Rachel Hood, a lawyer. At Cambridge, he was a successful sportsman and won blues for both discus and javelin.

Gosden started as assistant to two of the most successful trainers in the history of racing, first to champion trainer Vincent O'Brien and later, Sir Noel Murless. During his time with both men, they won a number of prestigious races including the Derby, the Oaks and the St. Leger Stakes.

He then moved to California, becoming assistant to Tommy Doyle, before attaining an American Horse Training license in 1979.

He began his training career with three horses, staying in California as he could only afford to rent single boxes and could not afford to rent a yard.

California
In 1983 he trained Bates Motel, a Handicap race horse. Bates Motel won the prestigious Santa Anita Handicap, the San Antonio Handicap and Philip H. Iselin Handicap, and later won the Eclipse Award. "Bates Motel won 'The Big Cap' in front of 85,000 people, it was some occasion", said Gosden later,"My first big winner – everybody needs a break in life and that was mine".

In 1984, he trained Royal Heroine, a turf mare, winning the Gamely Stakes and the inaugural Breeders' Cup Mile. Like Bates Motel, Royal Heroine also won the Eclipse Award. Over the next few years, Gosden won the Hollywood Turf Cup three times, the Yellow Ribbon Stakes twice, the Ramona Handicap twice and the San Antonio Handicap again with Hatim.

He also won both the Matriarch Stakes and the Vanity Handicap twice, the San Luis Rey Handicap with Zoffany, the Carleton F. Burke Handicap with Bel Bolide, the Clement L. Hirsch Turf Championship Stakes with Allez Milord and the Gamely Stakes for a second time.

Stanley House Stables
In 1989, Gosden moved to Newmarket, England, to train at Stanley House Stables. In 1991, he won the Prix de l'Abbaye de Longchamp with Keen Hunter and the Sun Chariot Stakes with Ristna. In 1992, he won the Irish St. Leger, Grosser Preis von Baden and Gran Premio di Milano with Mashaallah, the Prix de la Forêt with Wolfhound, and more than 100 other races.

Throughout the mid-1990s, Gosden formed a successful partnership with Frankie Dettori, winning hundreds of races with the Italian jockey. In 1993, he won the Irish Champion Stakes with Muhtarram, the Cheveley Park Stakes with Prophecy, the Haydock Sprint Cup with Wolfhound and the Premio Roma with Knifebox, in addition to more than 100 other races.

In 1994, he won the Prince of Wales's Stakes at Royal Ascot and the Premio Presidente della Repubblica with Muhtarram, the Lockinge Stakes with Emperor Jones and the Pretty Polly Stakes with Del Deya.

He won the Prince of Wales's Stakes in 1995 at Royal Ascot for the second year with Muhtarram, the Prix Jean Prat with Torrential, the Prix Lupin with Flemensfirth and the Prix de la Salamandre with Lord of Men, among many others.

In 1996, he won the British Classic St. Leger and the Gran Premio del Jockey Club with Shantou. He also won the Prix Marcel Boussac with Ryafan, and the Premio Roma with Flemensfirth.

In 1997, Gosden won the Derby with Benny the Dip. He also won the Gran Premio di Milano with Shantou (horse), and won four major races with Ryafan, the Falmouth Stakes and the Nassau Stakes in England, and the Yellow Ribbon Stakes and Queen Elizabeth II Challenge Cup Stakes in the United States of America. He later won the Poule d'Essai des Pouliches in France with Valentine Waltz.

Manton
In late 1999, it was announced that Gosden would move to Manton for the beginning of the 2000 season. He quickly enjoyed major successes, in May 2000, he won the 1,000 Guineas Stakes with Lahan. Later in the season, he won both Group One races held at Ascot with Observatory in Queen Elizabeth II Stakes and Crystal Music in the Fillies' Mile. In 2001, he won the Prix de la Forêt with Mount Abu, and the Prix Marcel Boussac with Sulk.

The 2002 season began well for Gosden. One of his first major victories came when Zenda beat Firth of Lorne in the prestigious Poule d'Essai des Pouliches in France. Coming off the rail in the straight and holding off challenges, the victory was impressive. "Zenda had been working very well at home", said Gosden, "The filly would have won in even better style if she had settled earlier".

He also won the Prix Melisande with Music Club, ridden by Frankie Dettori. Later, Gosden won at Royal Ascot again with Demonstrate in the Buckingham Palace Stakes. He also won the prestigious Golden Jubilee Stakes at Royal Ascot with Malhub. "I did a wild thing three months ago when I entered Malhub for this race", Gosden said, "I felt a mile was too far and decided to drop him back in distance and give him one smart entry over a shorter trip".

He then won the Prix Maurice de Gheest in France with May Ball. "She has been going well at home and we were expecting a big run", Gosden said afterwards, "It's a wonderful advertisement for keeping a five-year-old in training". He also won with at Chester with Treble Heights for football player Michael Owen, and the Solario Stakes with Foss Way. He also won the Strensall Stakes with Binary File and the Royal Lodge Stakes with Al Jadeed.

In 2003, he won the July Cup and the Nunthorpe Stakes with Oasis Dream.

The 2005 season started well for Gosden.  He won the Magnolia Stakes with Day Flight. Frankie Dettori, riding second, had carried them both across the course in the straight. "You wouldn’t think he used to work for me!", Gosden joked.

Later, Karen's Caper won the Nell Gwyn Stakes. "She really enjoyed coming up the rising ground and is crying out for a mile", Gosden said afterwards.  He also won the John Porter Stakes with Day Flight, and the Sunderlands Bookmakers Conditions Stakes with Plea Bargain. Day Flight won again, this time in the Ormonde Stakes.

Gosden then won the King Edward VII Stakes at Royal Ascot at York with Plea Bargain. "He's a lovely improving horse and the mile and a half is no problem", said Gosden. Playful Act won again, this time in the Lancashire Oaks. "It's been a long road back, but it's been worth it", said Gosden after the race. Playful Act would go on to be considered one of the finest broodmares in recent history.

He later won the Prestige Stakes with Nannina. "She’ll improve a lot", said Gosden. Nannina then won the very prestigious Fillies' Mile at Ascot. "They set a proper pace and Kieran had Jimmy in the box, but he wasn’t going to go there and she was well ridden", he said afterwards.

He then won the Royal Lodge Stakes at Ascot with Leo. Later, Gosden announced his decision to return to Newmarket to train at Clarehaven Stables. "The move to Manton was challenging, but I was pleased to win the 1,000 Guineas with Lahan within four months of being there", said Gosden,"She was our 100th Group winner in Europe". Explaining his decision, he said "I was in danger of being like my hero Bob Dylan, permanently on the road".

Clarehaven Stables

Gosden's first season at Clarehaven was successful. He won prestigious races including the Coronation Stakes at Royal Ascot with Nannina.

The 2007 season started well for Gosden, but it became even better as he won the Royal Hunt Cup at Royal Ascot with Royal Oath. After the race, the Racing Post crowned him "Royal Ascot's 'Mr. Reliable'". He also won the Windsor Forest Stakes at Royal Ascot with Nannina. It was the second time she had won at Royal Ascot. "She seems to find her best form at this course and it was a great training performance", said winning jockey Jimmy Fortune,"All I had to do was steer".

He also won with Raven's Pass, who was becoming widely regarded as a promising horse. He then won the Great Voltigeur Stakes with Lucarno. "The Leger could be the place to go", said Gosden speaking of Lucarno afterwards,"He's got a big stride and knows how to use it". He then won the Solario Stakes with Raven's Pass, breaking the track record. "I think he's a good horse and I like him a lot", said Gosden afterwards, comparing him favorably to two other horses he'd won the race with, Foss Way and Windsor Knot.

Amidst much anticipation, Gosden took Lucarno to Doncaster, and won the very prestigious St. Leger Stakes. "He is a really, really good horse but was a little immature as a two-year-old, which is why he didn’t run", said Gosden afterwards,"He worked well in the autumn last year and has run nothing but fabulous races all year". "He showed talent last year but I wanted to save him", Gosden also said, "He's done nothing but improve all season".

The 2008 season was an excellent one for Gosden. On the key Guineas trial day, he won four of the day's races with Infallible winning the prestigious Nell Gwyn Stakes, along with Virtual, Prohibit and Pampas Cat. Gosden then won his fourth Sandown Classic Trial with Centennial. Soon after, Michita won the Ribblesdale Stakes and Lucarno, winner of the 2007 St. Leger, won again in the Princess of Wales Stakes. He had another double at Newmarket with Upton Grey and Rainbow View. "She has a high cruising speed and looks like she has some class", said Gosden. Next, Gosden won the York Stakes with, beating Campanologist. Racer Forever also won the Criterion Stakes for Gosden and Fortune. A successful season continued as Rainbow View won the prestigious Sweet Solera Stakes.

Gosden then won two major races in the same day, the Celebration Mile with Raven's Pass the Great Voltigeur Stakes with Centennial. He then enjoyed more success in the May Hill Stakes at Doncaster with Rainbow View, who continued her unbeaten run. "She has done it very well and I couldn’t be more pleased with her", he said. He then won the Prix Minerve-Shadwell in France with Dar Re Mi, even though the ground was considered to reduce her prospects, "she would appreciate good going the most" Gosden said.

He then had another stunning day at Ascot, winning the showpiece Queen Elizabeth II Stakes with Raven's Pass and the Fillies' Mile with Rainbow View, completing the double for the second time. "We had three plans going in and got down to one in the end", said Gosden. Of Rainbow View he said "I didn’t train her for a test of stamina, be she's all heart and tough as well". Winning the Timform Million with Donativum allowed Gosden to supplement the two-year-old for the Breeders' Cup Juvenile Turf at Santa Anita. He continued a great season by winning the Cambridgeshire with Tazeez.

At Santa Anita in Los Angeles, one of the tracks on which Gosden had started his training career, he won two of the world's most prestigious races, the Breeders' Cup Juvenile Turf with Donativum and the Breeders' Cup Classic with Raven's Pass. Gosden described it as "a day I will cherish".

Gosden's 2009 season began well. He won the Kentucky Derby Challenge with Mafaz, and the Lincoln Handicap with Expresso Star. Then Neeham won the valuable 3-Y-O Trophy at Newmarket. "I really do like these sales races", Gosden said "and Donativum's defeat of Crowed House last year turned out to be a cracker". He then won the Earl of Sefton Stakes with Tazeez, for the same owner.

He then won the Jockey Club Stakes with Bronze Cannon, and had a double with Cadre and Ithbaat. He then won the prestigious Lockinge Stakes with Virtual, beating Alexandros. "It was a fabulous finish", said Gosden, "Twice Over and Pressing took the pace to test Paco Boy's stamina and it played into our favour. He had his head down when it mattered".

He then won the Hardwicke Stakes at Royal Ascot with Bronze Cannon. The horse, known as 'The Mighty Mouse' for his small stature, beat Campanologist. He then won the Pretty Polly Stakes with Dar Re Mi. "She stays well and wants a mile and a half, but luckily we got control" said Fortune, the winning jockey. Showcasing also won well. Gosden also won the Prix Eugène Adam in France with |Debussy. Later, Showcasing won the Gimcrack Stakes. "He is very much like his father and has bags of speed", said Gosden.

There was more success for Gosden with Dar Re Mi, as she won the Yorkshire Oaks, beating Sariska. He then won the Washington Singer Stakes with Azmeel, and the prestigious Matron Stakes with Rainbow View. Gosden was happy with the performance, "She did it well today and, similar to some good fillies I’ve had before, she has just taken some time to come to herself this season". He also won the Prix Dollar in France.

In November, Gosden returned to more success at Santa Anita, winning the Breeders' Cup Juvenile Turf with Pounced, for the second time in as many years. "It feels good to life this prize for the second year at Santa Anita, which I regard as my second home after spending so many years here as a young trainer", Gosden said. He also won the November Handicap with Charm School.

In early 2010, Gosden signed young jockey William Buick to ride for his stable. The decision was widely questioned, Buick was relatively untested at the highest level and Jimmy Fortune was widely regarded as a competent and effective jockey. However, Gosden is widely viewed as a good judge, the only other rider he has ever retained (apart from Buick) is Frankie Dettori. "I didn’t have a retainer and there has been no falling out", said Fortune, who still often rides for Gosden when Buick is not available.

Almost immediately, Gosden's choice was proved correct as Buick gave Dar Re Mi a fantastic ride to win the prestigious Dubai Sheema Classic. "She was given a beautiful ride by William Buick", said Gosden, "He knows what he is doing and he has a lot of brains". He also talked of the difficulties of training in winter, "Keeping her warm in England wasn’t easy, so it was quite a challenge".

Gosden continued his success, winning the Cheshire Oaks with Gertrude Bell and the Huxley Stakes with Debussy. He also won the Oaks Trial Stakes with Dyna Waltz, beating Timepiece. He also won the Queen Mary Stakes at Royal Ascot with Maqaasid. Gosden was delighted, "You have got a tailwind but she ran great". He also won the Summer Vase at Goodwood with Beachfire. It was the third time Gosden had won the race.

Gosden then won the Arlington Million with Debussy, beating Gio Ponti. Buick delivered a fantastic ride. "He rides cleverly", said Gosden, "He doesn’t panic in a race". He also won the Doncaster Cup with Samuel.

In September, Gosden won his third St. Leger when Arctic Cosmos beat Midas Touch and Rewilding. "This is the most fantastic experience for me" said winning owner Robin Geffen after another excellent ride from Buick. Soon after, Gosden and Buick won the Prix Foy in France with Duncan. He then won four races in quick succession, with The Shrew, Utley, Treasury Devil and Masked Marvel.

Gosden's 2011 season continued with more success as Gertrude Bell won the Warwick Fillies' Stakes and Investissement won the ToteScoop6 Handicap at Goodwood. He also won the prestigious Musidora Stakes with Jovality. He then won the Yorkshire Cup with Duncan, with another excellent ride from William Buick. Gosden described Duncan as "an enigmatic character" with "a ton of talent". He then won the prestigious King Edward VII Stakes at Royal Ascot with Nathaniel. He also won the Wolferton Handicap at Royal Ascot with Beachfire. "We put the headgear on him and it worked well", Gosden explained.

Soon after, he returned to Ascot with Nathaniel to win one of the world's most prestigious races, the King George VI and Queen Elizabeth Stakes. Gosden had let Buick judge the race and did not give his rider many instructions. Nathaniel came to the front and then eased away. "This horse is getting better and better", said Buick after the race. Gosden also won the Summer Double First Leg International with Bronze Prince, and the Canisbay Bloodstock Handicap with Aiken. He had more success in France, as Elusive Kate won again in the Prix du Calvados at Deauville.

Gosden won his fourth St. Leger and second with William Buick as Masked Marvel very impressively beat Brown Panther. After the fantastic performance Gosden said "From the day I saw him as a yearling I thought he was a Leger type". "He was a powerful little guy even then and he's got a great pedigree for the job". Very soon after, Gosden also won the Irish St. Leger with Duncan. Gosden then enjoyed further success when Elusive Kate won the very prestigious Prix Marcel Boussac at Longchamp, beating a fantastic field including Fire Lily and Zantenda.

Gosden's 2012 season has been one of his most successful. He won the Earl of Sefton Stakes with Questioning and the Musidora Stakes with The Fugue. At Royal Ascot, he was Champion Trainer, winning the Windsor Forest Stakes with Joviality and the Albany Stakes with Newfangled. He then won the Coronation Stakes at Royal Ascot with Fallen For You, the Wolverton Stakes with Gatewood, and the Duke of Edinburgh Stakes with Camborne.

He also won the Pretty Polly Stakes with Izzi Top. He then won three races in quick succession for Serena Rothschild, the Coral Challenge with Trade Commissioner, the Lancashire Oaks with Great Heavens and The Eclipse with Nathaniel. He also won the Bahrain Trophy with Shantaram. He also won the Prix Rothschild with Elusive Kate, and the Irish Oaks with Great Heavens.

He then won the Nassau Stakes with The Fugue. He also won the Great Voltigeur Stakes with Thought Worthy. In October, Gosden won the Tattersalls Millions Trophy with Ghurair, and the Geelong Cup with Gatewood. Gosden was British Champion Trainer in 2012.

Gosden won six Group One races, and over 100 other races in 2013. He won the Falmouth Stakes with Elusive Kate, the Nassau Stakes with Winsili and the Yorkshire Oaks with The Fugue. Elusive Kate also won the Prix Rothschild, The Fugue won the Irish Champion Stakes, and Seek Again won the Hollywood Derby. Gosden was British Champions Series champion trainer in 2013.

Gosden won eight Group One races in 2014, including the Irish 2,000 Guineas with Kingman and The Oaks with Taghrooda. Kingman also won the St. James's Palace Stakes, the Sussex Stakes and the Prix Jacques Le Marois. He also won the Prince of Wales's Stakes with The Fugue, the King George VI and Queen Elizabeth Stakes with Taghrooda and the Nassau Stakes with Sultanina. In November 2014, Kingman won the Cartier Award for Cartier Horse of the Year and Cartier Champion Three-year-old Colt. Taghrooda won the award for Cartier Champion Three-year-old Filly.

Gosden's 2015 season saw him become Champion Trainer again, with Golden Horn and Jack Hobbs generally considered his best horses of the season. He won the Derby and the Eclipse with Golden Horn, the Prix Morny and the Middle Park Stakes with Shalaa, and the Prix de Diane with Star of Seville. He also won the Irish Derby with Jack Hobbs, after Hobbs had finished second in the Epsom Derby behind Golden Horn. Later in the season, Golden Horn won the Irish Champion Stakes and the Prix de l'Arc de Triomphe. "Today you saw the real Golden Horn", said jockey Frankie Dettori. "He put to bed a great Arc field like a true champion. Over the last furlong and a half it would have been impossible for any horse to get near me. I pressed the button and he flew. Think of the horses he has beaten and beaten well. I spent the last furlong enjoying myself. He has given me some tremendous pleasure and is probably the best horse that I’ve ridden."

Gosden finished second in the 2016 Trainer's championship winning the Nell Gwyn Stakes with Nathra, the John Guest Bengough Stakes with Shalaa, the Flying Childers Stakes with Ardad and the Hungerford Stakes with Richard Pankhurst. He also won the Lillie Langtry Stakes with California, The Dante Stakes with Wings of Desire, the Tattersalls Musidora Stakes with So Mi Dar, The Tattersalls Millions 3-Y-O Trophy with Linguistic and the Earl of Sefton Stakes with Mahsoob. He also won the British Champions Fillies' and Mares' Stakes with Journey at Ascot on British Champions Day.

Gosden was appointed Officer of the Order of the British Empire (OBE) in the 2017 New Year Honours for services to horseracing and training.

Major wins
 Great Britain
 1000 Guineas – (1) – Lahan (2000)
 Ascot Gold Cup – (3) – Stradivarius (2018, 2019, 2020)
 British Champions Fillies' and Mares' Stakes – (3) – Journey (2016), Star Catcher (2019), Emily Upjohn (2022)
 Champion Stakes – (2) –  Cracksman (2017, 2018) 
 Cheveley Park Stakes – (1) – Prophecy (1993)
 Coronation Cup – (1) – Cracksman (2018)
 Coronation Stakes – (3) – Nannina (2006), Fallen For You (2012), Inspiral (2022)
 Dewhurst Stakes – (1) – Too Darn Hot (2018)
 Derby – (2) – Benny the Dip (1997), Golden Horn (2015)
 Eclipse Stakes – (4) – Nathaniel (2012), Golden Horn (2015), Roaring Lion (2018), Enable (2019)
 Falmouth Stakes – (3) – Ryafan (1997), Elusive Kate (2013), Nazeef (2020)
 Fillies' Mile – (6) – Crystal Music (2000), Playful Act (2004), Nannina (2005), Rainbow View (2008), Inspiral (2021), Commissioning (2022)
 Golden Jubilee Stakes – (1) – Malhub (2002)
 Goodwood Cup – (5) – Sonus (1993), Stradivarius (2017, 2018, 2019, 2020)
 Haydock Sprint Cup – (1) – Wolfhound (1993)
 International Stakes – (2) – Roaring Lion (2018), Mishriff (2021)
 July Cup – (1) – Oasis Dream (2003)
 King George VI and Queen Elizabeth Stakes – (5) – Nathaniel (2011), Taghrooda (2014), Enable (2017, 2019, 2020)
 Lockinge Stakes – (3) – Emperor Jones (1994), Virtual (2009), Palace Pier (2021)
 Middle Park Stakes – (2) – Oasis Dream (2002), Shalaa (2015)
 Nassau Stakes – (5) – Ryafan (1997), The Fugue (2012), Winsili (2013), Sultanina (2014), Nashwa (2022)
 Nunthorpe Stakes – (1) – Oasis Dream (2003)
 Oaks Stakes – (3) – Taghrooda (2014), Enable (2017), Anapurna (2019)
 Prince of Wales's Stakes – (4) – Muhtarram (1994, 1995), The Fugue (2014), Lord North (2020)
 Queen Anne Stakes - (1) - Palace Pier (2021)
 Queen Elizabeth II Stakes – (4) – Observatory (2000), Raven's Pass (2008), Persuasive (2017), Roaring Lion (2018)
 St. James's Palace Stakes – (3) – Kingman (2014), Without Parole (2018), Palace Pier (2020)
 St. Leger – (5) – Shantou (1996), Lucarno (2007), Arctic Cosmos (2010), Masked Marvel (2011), Logician (2019)
 Sun Chariot Stakes – (2) – Ristna (1991), Nazeef (2020)
 Sussex Stakes – (2) – Kingman (2014), Too Darn Hot (2019)
 Yorkshire Oaks – (4) – Dar Re Mi (2009), The Fugue (2013), Enable (2017), Enable (2019)

 France
 Grand Prix de Saint-Cloud – (1) – Coronet (2019)
 Poule d'Essai des Pouliches – (2) – Valentine Waltz (1999), Zenda (2002)
 Prix de l'Abbaye de Longchamp – (1) – Keen Hunter (1991)
 Prix de l'Arc de Triomphe – (3) – Golden Horn (2015), Enable (2017, 2018)
 Prix de Diane – (2) – Star Of Seville (2015), Nashwa (2022)
 Prix de la Forêt – (2) – Wolfhound (1992), Mount Abu (2001)
 Prix de Royallieu – (3) – Annaba (1996), Anapurna (2019), Loving Dream (2021)
 Prix d'Ispahan – (1) – Observatory (2001)
 Prix du Jockey Club – (1) – Mishriff (2020)
 Prix Ganay – (1) – Cracksman (2018)
 Prix Jacques Le Marois – (4) – Kingman (2014), Palace Pier (2020, 2021), Inspiral (2022) 
 Prix Jean Prat – (2) – Torrential (1995), Too Darn Hot (2019)
 Prix Jean Romanet – (2) – Izzi Top (2012), Coronet (2019)
 Prix Lupin – (1) – Flemensfirth (1995)
 Prix Marcel Boussac – (3) – Ryafan (1996), Sulk (2001), Elusive Kate (2011)
 Prix Maurice de Gheest – (1) – May Ball (2002)
 Prix Morny – (1) – Shalaa (2015)
 Prix Rothschild – (2) – Elusive Kate (2012, 2013)
 Prix de la Salamandre – (1) – Lord of Men (1995)
 Prix Vermeille – (1) – Star Catcher (2019)

 Germany
 Grosser Preis von Baden – (1) – Mashaallah (1992)
 Preis der Diana – (1) – Miss Yoda (2020)

 Ireland
 Irish 2,000 Guineas – (1) – Kingman (2014)
 Irish Champion Stakes – (4) – Muhtarram (1993), The Fugue (2013), Golden Horn (2015), Roaring Lion (2018)
 Irish Derby – (1) – Jack Hobbs (2015)
 Irish Oaks – (3) – Great Heavens (2012), Enable (2017), Star Catcher (2019)
 Irish St. Leger – (2) – Mashaallah (1992), Duncan (dead heat 2011)
 Matron Stakes – (1) – Rainbow View (2009)
 Pretty Polly Stakes – (3) – Del Deya (1994), Dar Re Mi (2009), Izzi Top (2012)

 Italy
 Gran Premio del Jockey Club – (1) – Shantou (1996)
 Gran Premio di Milano – (2) – Mashaallah (1992), Shantou (1997)
 Premio Presidente della Repubblica – (1) – Muhtarram (1994)
 Premio Roma – (2) – Knifebox (1993), Flemensfirth (1996)

 Saudi Arabia
 Saudi Cup – (1) – Mishriff (2021)

 UAE
 Dubai Sheema Classic – (3) – Dar Re Mi (2010), Jack Hobbs (2017), Mishriff (2021)
Dubai Turf - (2) - Lord North (2021 & 2022)

 United States
 Arlington Million – (1) – Debussy (2010)
 Beverly Hills Handicap – (2) – Absentia (1983), Royal Heroine (1984)
 Breeders' Cup Classic – (1) – Raven's Pass (2008)
 Breeders' Cup Juvenile Turf – (2) – Donativum (2008), Pounced (2009)
 Breeders' Cup Mile – (1) – Royal Heroine (1984)
 Breeders' Cup Turf – (1) – Enable (2018)
 Carleton F. Burke Handicap – (1) – Bel Bolide (1983)
 Clement L. Hirsch Turf Championship Stakes – (1) – Allez Milord (1987)
 Del Mar Handicap – (3) – Bel Bolide (1983), Barberstown (1985), Sword Dance (1988)
 Hollywood Derby – (2) – Royal Heroine (1983), Seek Again (2013)
 Hollywood Turf Cup – (3) – Alphabatim (1984, 1986), Zoffany (1985)
 Matriarch Stakes – (2) – Royal Heroine (1984), Asteroid Field (1987)
 Pacific Classic Stakes – (1) – Tinners Way (1994)
 Philip H. Iselin Handicap – (1) – Bates Motel (1983)
 Queen Elizabeth II Challenge Cup Stakes – (1) – Ryafan (1997)
 Ramona Handicap – (1) – Annoconnor (1988)
 San Antonio Handicap – (2) – Bates Motel (1983), Hatim (1986)
 San Luis Rey Handicap – (1) – Zoffany (1987)
 Santa Anita Handicap – (1) – Bates Motel (1983)
 Vanity Handicap – (1) – Annoconnor (1988)
 Yellow Ribbon Stakes – (2) – Bonne Ile (1986), Ryafan (1997)

Personal life
Gosden is the son of racehorse trainer John "Towser" Gosden, who died in 1967. He studied economics at Cambridge University. He currently lives in Newmarket, England, and is married to Rachel Hood, a lawyer. He has four children, Sebastian, Serena, Theodora and Thaddeus.

Gosden is considered to be more open and informative than some other trainers, and is called "one of the sport's great communicatiors". His television interviews are often praised,"Gosden is Cary Grant in Ernie Els's body. He is the Big Easy with a sly smile, a wry wit, and a charismatic charm".

Gosden is a dedicated music fan, according to Ronnie Wood, guitarist for the Rolling Stones. "He knows his music history. He knows everything about Bob Dylan, followed by everything about the Stones. He knows all the words and everything", said Wood. Gosden also describes himself as "a Neil Young man", and said "I went to see him the other week at the Hammersmith Apollo and it was just wonderful".

In addition to music, Gosden is a keen fan of art and opera, "Some people get on that narrow-gauge railway and have nothing except racing to talk about, but it would drive me mad. I guess I'd be happiest if they built a racecourse in Hyde Park…but from here I can dart into London, 60 miles, go to the opera, the ballet, see a band".

Gosden opposes all forms of race-day medication. His interest in the environment has also led him to make a number of sustainability commitments.

Gosden has said of his position, "You have to move along gracefully if you can, and hopefully with a following wind, with common sense, a sense of reality, humility and a bit of history". His office is decorated with pictures of some of the most successful horses he has trained,"Paintings of champion horses – the filly Ryafan, last year's Breeders' Cup hero Raven's Pass – look down from the walls".

Gosden is a Conservative Party donor, contributing £25,000 to the party including £10,000 to Newmarket MP Matt Hancock.

References

External links
 John Gosden's official website

1951 births
Living people
People educated at Eastbourne College
Alumni of Emmanuel College, Cambridge
People from Hove
British racehorse trainers
Officers of the Order of the British Empire
British expatriates in the United States
Cartier Award winners
Conservative Party (UK) donors